The following tables compare general and technical information between a number of notable IRC client programs for mobile devices.

General
Basic general information about the clients: creator/company, license/price etc. Clients listed on a light purple background are no longer in active development.

Release history
A brief overview of the release history.

Protocol support
What IRC related protocols and standards are supported by each client.

Direct client-to-client (DCC) support

Features
Information on what features each of the clients support.

See also
 Comparison of Internet Relay Chat clients
 Comparison of instant messaging clients
 Comparison of instant messaging protocols
 Comparison of LAN messengers

References

Mobile
Internet Relay Chat clients, mobile
Mobile software